The Gâra Djebilet mine is an iron mine located in Tindouf Province in western Algeria which entered into operation in July 2022. It represents one of the largest iron ore reserves in the world. Its reserves are estimated at 3.5 billion tons, of which 1.7 billion tons are exploitable.

History 
The Gâra Djebilet mine was discovered in 1952 by the French geologist Pierre Gevin.

On June 15, 1972, Morocco and Algeria signed a joint agreement for the development of the mine. This provides for the exploitation of the Algerian mine and the transport of iron through Morocco via its access to the ocean, but this agreement has not been followed up.

On March 12, 2017, the National Iron and Steel Company (Feraal) signed a Memorandum of understanding with the Chinese company Sinosteel equipment & engineering to carry out feasibility studies for the development of the deposit. The contract also includes the performance by Chinese research centers of dephosphorization and enrichment tests on four different processes. In 2015, Algerian laboratories were able to achieve a dephosphorization rate of around 0.1%.

Its operation is formalized on July 30, 2022.

Characteristics 

The industrial exploitation of Gâra Djebilet ore begins in 2022 with a planned production of 2 to 3 million tonnes of ore per year in a first stage (2022-2025), then 40 to 50 million tonnes/year from 2026. The project will position Algeria as a leader in the African steel and metallurgical industry.

Some experts have doubted the profitability of the project, Gâra Djebilet being characterized by a high content of phosphorus present in the iron, requiring to obtain a quality ore, an operation called dephosphorization, which is expensive and complex.

References 

Iron mines in Algeria